Gender history is a sub-field of history and gender studies, which looks at the past from the perspective of gender. It is in many ways, an outgrowth of women's history. The discipline considers in what ways historical events and periodization impact women differently from men. For instance, in an influential article in 1977, "Did Women have a Renaissance?", Joan Kelly questioned whether the notion of a Renaissance was relevant to women. 
Gender historians are also interested in how gender difference has been perceived and configured at different times and places, usually with the assumption that such differences are socially constructed. These social constructions of gender throughout time are also represented as changes in the expected norms of behavior for those labeled male or female. Those who study gender history note these changes in norms and those performing them over time and interpret what those changes say about the larger social/cultural/political climate.

Women's historians and gender histories 
Women's historians and scholars have made the differentiation between the terms “gender” and “sex.” Sex was determined to be the biological makeup of an individual, while gender was determined to be the chosen identity of an individual. Natsuki Aruga has argued that the work of women's historians regarding gender has helped to solidify the distinction between gender and sex. Women's studies and feminism form part of the base of gender studies, of which gender history is a sub-field. Kathleen Brown has stated that there is a level of difficulty in determining a distinction between women's and gender studies as there is no singular and overarching definition of what it means to be a woman. This in turn leads to difficulty in determining a distinction between women's and gender histories.

While some historians are hesitant to accept the title of "women's historian," others have taken on the title willingly. Those who have accepted the title tend to place a large emphasis on the study of the welfare state in relation to feminist history and the role that gender has played as an organizational factor of the state. The focus of feminist historians has also drifted to Democratic Party policy and the realm of policy, including pay-equity, which is a part of both social and political history.

Impact
Despite its relatively short life, gender history (and its forerunner women's history) has had a rather significant effect on the general study of history. Since the 1960s, when the initially small field first achieved a measure of acceptance, it has gone through a number of different phases, each with its own challenges and outcomes, but always making an impact of some kind on the historical discipline. Although some of the changes to the study of history have been quite obvious, such as increased numbers of books on famous women or simply the admission of greater numbers of women into the historical profession, other influences are more subtle, even though they may be more politically groundbreaking in the end. By 1970, gender historians turned to documenting ordinary women's expectations, aspirations and status. In the 80s with the rise of the feminist movement, the focus shifted to uncovering women' oppression and discrimination. Nowadays, gender history is more about charting female agency and recognizing female achievements in several fields that were usually dominated by men.

Within the profession
According to historian Joan Scott, conflict occurred between Women's History historians and other historians in a number of ways. In the American Historical Association, when feminists argued that female historians were treated unequally within the field and underrepresented in the association, they were essentially leveling charges of historical negligence by traditional historians. Notions of professionalism were not rejected outright, but they were accused of being biased.

Supplementary history
According to Scott, the construction of Women's History as "supplementary" to the rest of history had a similar effect. At first glance, a supplement simply adds information which has been missing from the greater story, but as Scott points out, it also questions why the information was left out in the first place. Whenever it is noticed that a woman found to be missing from written history, Women's History first describes her role, second, examines which mechanisms allowed her role to be omitted, and third, asks to what other information these mechanisms were blind.

Gender theory
Finally, the advent of gender theory once again challenged commonly held ideas of the discipline, including those scholars studying Women's History. Post-modern criticism of essentialising socially constructed groups, be they gender groups or otherwise, pointed out the weaknesses in various sorts of history. In the past, historians have attempted to describe the shared experience of large numbers of people, as though these people and their experiences were homogeneous and uniform. Women have multiple identities, influenced by any number of factors including race and class, and any examination of history which conflates their experiences, fails to provide an accurate picture.

History of Masculinity
The history of masculinity emerged as a specialty in the 1990s, evidenced by numerous studies of men in groups, and how concepts of masculinity shape their values and behavior. Gail Bederman identified two approaches: one that emerged from women's history and one that ignored it:
Two types of ‘men’s history’ are being written these days. One builds on twenty years of women’s history scholarship, analyzing masculinity as part of larger gender and cultural processes. The other . . . looks to the past to see how men in early generations understood (and misunderstood) themselves as men. Books of the second type mostly ignore women’s history findings and methodology.

Gender in religion 
All over the world, religion is formed around a divine, supernatural figure. While the idea of the divine, supernatural figure varies from religion to religion, each one is framed around different concepts of what it means to be male and female. In many religions, Christianity in particular, women or symbols of female deities are worshipped for their fertility. Furthermore, the religion of a culture usually directly corresponds or is influenced by the culture's gender structure, like the family structures and/or the state. Therefore, the religious structure and the gender structure work together to form and define a culture, creating the defining structures of equality and uniformity.

See also
 Aspasia, A scholarly journal
 Family history
 Herstory, A term for feminist historiography
 History of feminism
 Legal rights of women in history
 Schlesinger Library, A major collection at Harvard University
 Sex in the American Civil War
 Women in Church history
 Women in combat
 Women in the Middle Ages
 Women's history
 History of women in the Indian subcontinent
 History of women in the United Kingdom
 History of women in the United States
 Women in World War I
 Women in World War II

References

Further reading
 Anderson, Marnie S. "The Forgotten History of Japanese Women's History and the Rise of Women and Gender History in the Academy." Journal of Women's History 32.1 (2020): 62-84. online

Bennett, Judith M. and Ruth Mazo Karras, eds. The Oxford Handbook of Women & Gender in Medieval Europe (2013) 626pp.
Blom, Ida, et al. "The Past and Present of European Women's and Gender History: A Transatlantic Conversation." Journal of Women's History 25.4 (2013): 288–308.
 Canning, Kathleen. //Gender history in practice: historical perspectives on bodies, class & citizenship (Cornell University Press, 2006).
 Carstairs, Catherine, and Nancy Janovicek. "The Dangers of Complacency: women’s history/gender history in Canada in the twenty-first century." Women's History Review 27.1 (2018): 29–40.
  De Groot, Joanna  and Sue Morgan, eds. Sex, Gender and the Sacred: Reconfiguring Religion in Gender History (2014).
Hagemann, Karen, and Donna Harsch. "Gendering Central European History: Changing Representations of Women and Gender in Comparison, 1968–2017." Central European History 51.1 (2018): 114–127.
 Des Jardins, Julie. "Women’s and gender History." in The Oxford history of historical writing: Volume 5: Historical writing since 1945 (2011): 136+.
 Hagemann, Karen, et al. eds. The Oxford Handbook of Gender, War, and the Western World since 1600 (2022)

 Jameson, Elizabeth. "Halfway across That Line: Gender at the Threshold of History in the North American West." Western Historical Quarterly 47.1 (2016): 1-26.
 Levine, Philippa, ed. Gender and Empire ( Oxford History of the British Empire Companion Series. 2004).
 Petö, Andrea, and Judith Szapor, "The State of Women's and Gender History in Eastern Europe: The Case of Hungary," Journal of Women's History,  (20070, Vol. 19 Issue, pp 160–166

Riley, Denise. “Am I That Name?” Feminism and the Category of 'Women' in History. Minneapolis: University of Minnesota Press, 1988.
 Rose, Shelley E. "German and American Transnational Spaces in Women's and Gender History." Journal of Women's History 30.1 (2018): 163–169.
Rose, Sonya O. What is Gender History?. Malden, Mass.: Polity Press, 2010.
 Scott, Joan Wallach. Gender and the Politics of History (1999), influential theoretical essays  excerpt and text search
 Sheldon, Kathleen. 'Women's History: Africa" in 
 Spongberg, Mary. Writing Women's History Since the Renaissance. (2003) 308 pages; on Europe
Stryker, Susan. Transgender History (2nd ed. 2017) a history of the movement in the United States.

 Thébaud, Françoise. "Writing Women's and Gender History in France: A National Narrative?" Journal of Women's History, (2007) 19#1 pp 167–172.
 Timm, Annette F., and Joshua A. Sanborn. Gender, sex and the shaping of modern Europe: A history from the French Revolution to the present day (Bloomsbury Publishing, 2022).
 Umoren, Imaobong D. "From the margins to the center: African American women's and gender history since the 1970s." History Compass 13.12 (2015): 646–658.
 Vertinsky, Patricia. "Gender Matters in Sport History." in Robert Edelman and Wayne Wilson, eds., The Oxford Handbook of Sports History (2017): 445–60.
Zemon Davis, Natalie. “ ‘Women’s History’ in Transition: The European Case.” Feminist Studies 3, no. 3–4 (1976):

History of Masculinity
 Bederman, Gail. Manliness & Civilization: A Cultural History of Gender and Race in the United States, 1880-1917. Chicago: Chicago University Press, 1995.
Connell, R.W. Masculinities. Berkeley: University of California Press, 1995.
 Dierks, Konstantin. "Men’s History, Gender History, or Cultural History?" Gender & History 14 (2002): 147–51
 Ditz, Toby L. "The New Men’s History and the Peculiar Absence of Gendered Power: Some Remedies from Early American Gender History," Gender & History 16 (2004): 1-35
 Dorsey, Bruce. "A Man's World: Revisiting Histories of Men and Gender." Reviews in American History 40#3 (2012): 452–458. online
 Gorn, Elliott J. The Manly Art–Bare-Knuckle Prize Fighting in America (1986)
 Griswold, Robert L. Fatherhood in America: A history (1993)
 Rotundo, E. Anthony. American manhood: Transformations in masculinity from the Revolution to the modern era (1993).  excerpt
 Soine, Aeleah. "The 'Gender Problem' in Nursing: Masculinity and Citizenship in Late Wilhelmine Germany." German Studies Review 42.3 (2019): 447-467, how women replaced men in German nursing. excerpt

Tosh, John. Manliness and masculinities in nineteenth-century Britain: Essays on gender, family and empire (Routledge, 2017).
 Traister, Bryce. "Academic Viagra: The Rise of American Masculinity Studies," American Quarterly'' 52 (2000): 274–304 in JSTOR

External links
Main focus "Frauen- und Geschlechtergeschichte in Westfalen"
Interview with Professor Dalia Ofer, Institute of Contemporary Jewry, The Hebrew University of Jerusalem, about women and gender during the Holocaust, Yad Vashem website.

Gender studies
History of social movements
Feminism and history
Men in history
Women's history